Jowzjan, sometimes spelled Jawzjan or Jozjan, is one of the thirty-four provinces of Afghanistan, located in the north of the country bordering neighboring Turkmenistan. The province is divided into 11 districts and contains hundreds of villages. It has a population of about 613,481, which is multi-ethnic and mostly agriculturalists. Sheberghan is the capital of Jozjan province.

History

The province is named after the early medieval region and principality of Juzjan. Between the early 16th century and mid-18th century, the area was ruled by the Khanate of Bukhara. It was conquered by Ahmad Shah Durrani and became part of the Durrani Empire in or about 1750, which formed to the modern state of Afghanistan. The area was untouched by the British during the three Anglo-Afghan wars that were fought in the 19th and 20th centuries.

Recent history
Following a series of changing allegiances and falling out with Uzbek warlord Abdul Malik Pahlawan in 1997, the Taliban withdrew from the area, but in 1998 a contingent of 8,000 Taliban troops pressed through neighboring Faryab, seizing Abdul Rashid Dostum's headquarters in Sheberghan.

Swedish-led Provincial Reconstruction Team (PRT), which has been based in Mazar-e-Sharif since about 2005 and responsible for four provinces including Jozjan, established an office and some troops in the province. Security situation in the province has rapidly deteriorated in 2009 and 2010. A new Turkish PRT has also been established in the province in the summer of 2010, providing security to the area which also covers Sar-e Pol. The Afghan National Security Forces (ANFS) began expanding in the last decade and gradually took over security from International Security Assistance Force (ISAF). The Afghanistan-Turkmenistan border is maintained by the Afghan Border Police (ABP) while law and order for the rest of the province is provided by the NATO-trained Afghan National Police (ANP).

Although it can be regarded as a relatively secured place compared to some other provinces of Afghanistan, there is an increasing number of incidents particularly in Darzab, Qush Tepa and Fayzabad districts. The Mazar-e-Sharif-Sheberghan highway (called Aqyol) has turned into a dangerous traveling route because of militants carrying out attacks against government forces, NGO workers and civilians.

In April 2012 construction of a mega power network with power pylons carrying 500 megawatts of electricity from neighboring Turkmenistan started in the province; the project is supported by Turkmenistan and Turkey. Initial work on the $390 million project had already been completed. Turkmenistan will install power pylons over a distance of 374 kilometres on its soil toward the Afghanistan border and the project will take a year to complete. The network would supply electricity to many areas in Jozjan, Balkh, Sar-e Pol, Faryab and Kabul provinces.

Healthcare
The percentage of households with clean drinking water increased from 24% in 2005 to 44% in 2011.
The percentage of births attended to by a skilled birth attendant increased from 9% in 2005 to 21% in 2011.

Education

The overall literacy rate (6+ years of age) fell from 31% in 2005 to 16% in 2011.
The overall net enrolment rate (6–13 years of age) increased from 40% in 2005 to 46% in 2011.The primary school numbers in the province  as of 2011 accounts for 116 (2011).

Geography and demographics account

Jozjan is situated in the northern part of Afghanistan, bordering Turkmenistan in the north, Balkh province in the east, Sar-e Pol province in the south and Faryab province in the west. Jozjan province covers an area of 10,326 km2. More than one quarter of the province is mountainous or semi mountainous terrain (29.4%), while more than two thirds of the area is made up of flat land (68.9%). It is one of the provinces known to contain petroleum and natural gas. Mining and agriculture are the main industries.

As of 2021, the population of Jozjan province is about 613,481, who are multi-ethnic and mostly farmers. Occasional ethnic violence is reported in the area, most recently in 2002.

39.5% of the population speak Uzbek, 28.7% speak Turkmen, 17.2% speak Pashto, 12.1% speak Dari Persian and 2.5% speaks other languages.

14.1% of the population lived below the national poverty line.

Notable people 

 Zhulād of Gōzgān, ruler of the mid 7th century, in the region of Guzgan, then part of Tokharistan
 Ibrahim ibn Ya'qub al-Juzajani, 9th century Muslim scholar, student of ibn Hanbal
 Abu 'Ubayd al-Juzjani, from the 11th century, the famous pupil of Avicenna, was from this region, hence his name
 Minhaj-i Siraj Juzjani (born 1193), thirteenth-century chronicler of India
 Abdul Rashid Dostum, Vice President of Afghanistan, is from Hodja Dukhu village of this province
 Qari Hekmat, leader of Islamic State of Iraq and the Levant in Darzab District.
 Abdul Salam Hanafi, Acting Second Deputy Prime Minister of Afghanistan.

See also 
 Al-Juzjani
 Provinces of Afghanistan

References

External links 

Jowzjan Province - Powerpoint Overview

 
Provinces of Afghanistan
Provinces of the Islamic Republic of Afghanistan